The Greece national football team results (2000–19) is a list of international matches played between 2000 and 2019.

Matches

2000

2001

2002

2003

2004

2005

2006

2007

2008

2009

2010

2011

2012

2013

2014

2015

2016

2017

2018

2019

Greece against other countries

Notes

References

External links
Greece fixtures on eloratings.net
Greece on soccerway.com

Greece national football team results
2000s in Greece
2010s in Greece